St Faith's Church may refer to

England
St Faith's Church, Bacton, Herefordshire
St Faith's Church, Belper Lane End, Derbyshire
St Faith's Church, Cowes, Isle of Wight 
St Faith's Church, Dunswell, East Riding of Yorkshire
St Faith, Farmcote
St Faith's Church, Gaywood, Norfolk
St Faith's Church, Havant, Hampshire
St Faith's Church, Hexton, Hertfordshire
St Faith's Church, Kelshall
St Faith's Church, Kilsby, Northamptonshire
St Faith's Church, Little Witchingham, Norfolk
St Faith's Church, Newton, Northamptonshire
St Faith's Church, Nottingham
St Faith's Church, Shellingford, Oxfordshire 
St Faith's Church, Wilsthorpe, Lincolnshire
St Faith's Church, Winchester
St Faith under St Paul's, City of London
Horsham St. Faith Priory, Horsham St Faith, Norfolk

Australia
St Faith's Church, Glen Iris, Victoria
St Faith's Church, Pechey, Queensland

France
St. Faith's Church, Sélestat

See also
St. Faith's, KwaZulu-Natal, South Africa
St Faith's School